The 1904 United States presidential election in Iowa took place on November 8, 1904. All contemporary 45 states were part of the 1904 United States presidential election. Voters chose 13 electors to the Electoral College, which selected the president and vice president.

Iowa was won by the Republican nominees, incumbent President Theodore Roosevelt of New York and his running mate Charles W. Fairbanks of Indiana.

Results

Results by county

See also
 United States presidential elections in Iowa

Notes

References

Iowa
1904
1904 Iowa elections